The Walt Disney Company, commonly known as Disney, is an American multinational, mass media and entertainment conglomerate that is headquartered at the Walt Disney Studios complex in Burbank, California. Disney was founded on October 16, 1923, by brothers Walt and Roy O. Disney as Disney Brothers Studio; it also operated under the names Walt Disney Studio and Walt Disney Productions before changing its name to The Walt Disney Company in 1986. Early in its existence, the company established itself as a leader in the animation industry, with the creation of the widely popular character Mickey Mouse, who first appeared in Steamboat Willie, which used synchronized sound, to become the first post-produced sound cartoon. The character would go on to become the company's mascot.

After becoming a major success by the early 1940s, the company diversified into live-action films, television, and theme parks in the 1950s. Following Walt Disney's death in 1966, the company's profits, especially in the animation division, began to decline. Once Disney's shareholders voted Michael Eisner as the head of the company in 1984, it became overwhelmingly successful  during a period called the Disney Renaissance. In 2005, under new CEO Bob Iger, the company started to expand and acquire other corporations. Bob Chapek became the head of Disney in 2020 after Iger's retirement. Chapek was ousted in 2022 and Iger was reinstated as CEO.

Since the 1980s, Disney has created and acquired corporate divisions to market more mature content than is typically associated with its family-oriented brands. The company is known for its film-studio division Walt Disney Studios, which includes Walt Disney Pictures, Walt Disney Animation Studios, Pixar, Marvel Studios, Lucasfilm, 20th Century Studios, 20th Century Animation, and Searchlight Pictures. Disney's other main business units include divisions in television, broadcasting, streaming media, theme park resorts, consumer products, publishing, and international operations. Through these divisions, Disney owns and operates the ABC broadcast network; cable television networks such as Disney Channel, ESPN, Freeform, FX, and National Geographic; publishing, merchandising, music, and theater divisions; direct-to-consumer streaming services such as Disney+, Star+, ESPN+, Hulu, and Hotstar; and Disney Parks, Experiences and Products, which includes several theme parks, resort hotels, and cruise lines around the world.

Disney is one of the biggest and best-known companies in the world, and has been ranked number 53 on the 2022 Fortune 500 list of biggest companies in the United States by revenue. Since its founding, the company has won 135 Academy Awards, 26 of which have been awarded to Walt. The company has been said to have produced some of the greatest films of all time, as well as revolutionizing the theme park industry. Disney has been criticized for supposed plagiarism, depicting racial stereotypes in the past, and both including and lacking LGBT-related elements in its films. The company, which has been public since 1940, trades on the New York Stock Exchange (NYSE) with ticker symbol DIS and has been a component of the Dow Jones Industrial Average since 1991. In August 2020, just under two-thirds of the stock was owned by large financial institutions.

History

1923–1934: Founding, Mickey Mouse, and Silly Symphonies 

Walt Disney and his friend animator Ub Iwerks had founded a film studio named Laugh-O-Gram Studio in Kansas City. Iwerks and Disney made a short film entitled Alice's Wonderland, which depicted child actor Virginia Davis interacting with animated characters. In 1923, soon after the short was made, Laugh-O-Gram Studio went bankrupt but the film later became a hit after New York film distributor Margaret J. Winkler purchased it. Disney signed a contract to create six series of Alice Comedies with an option for two more six-episode series. Before signing the contract, Disney decided to move to Hollywood, Los Angeles, to join his brother Roy O. Disney, who had tuberculosis. Walt and Roy founded Disney Brothers Studio on October 16, 1923, to produce the films. Walt later persuaded Iwerks' and Davis' families to move to Hollywood as well. 

In January 1926, the Disney studio on Hyperion Street was completed, and Disney Brothers Studio's name was changed to Walt Disney Studio. After producing several Alice films for the next four years, Winkler handed the role of distributing films to her husband Charles Mintz. In 1927, Mintz asked for a new series of films to be made under Universal Pictures. In response, Walt created his first series of fully animated films, which featured the character Oswald the Lucky Rabbit. Walt Disney Studio created 26 films with Oswald in them.

In 1928, Walt wanted a larger fee for his films but Mintz wanted to reduce the price. Soon after, Walt discovered Universal Pictures owned the intellectual property rights to Oswald, and Mintz threatened to produce the films without him if he did not accept the reduction in payment. Walt declined and Mintz signed four of Walt Disney Studio's primary animators to start his own studio; Iwerks was the only top animator to remain with the Disney brothers. Walt and Iwerks replaced Oswald with a mouse character that was originally named Mortimer Mouse but  Walt's wife urged him to change the name to Mickey Mouse. In May 1928, the studio made the silent films Plane Crazy and The Gallopin' Gaucho as test screening for the new character. Later that year, the studio produced its first sound film—the third short in the Mickey Mouse series—Steamboat Willie, which was made using synchronized sound, becoming the first post-produced sound cartoon. The sound was created using Powers’ Cinephone system, which used Lee de Forest's Phonofilm system. Pat Powers’ distribution company distributed Steamboat Willie, which became an immediate hit. In 1929, the company successfully re-released the two earlier films with synchronized sound.

After the release of Steamboat Willie at the Colony Theater in New York, Mickey Mouse became an immensely popular character. Disney Brothers Studio made several cartoons featuring Mickey and other characters. In August 1929, the company began making the Silly Symphony cartoon series with Columbia Pictures as the series' distributor because the Disney brothers felt they were not receiving their share of profits from Powers. Powers ended his contract with Iwerks, who later started his own studio. Carl W. Stalling played an important role in starting the series, and composed the music for early films but left the company after Iwerks' departure. In September, theater manager Harry Woodin requested permission to start a Mickey Mouse Club at his theater the Fox Dome to boost attendance. Walt agreed but David E. Dow started the first-such club at Elsinore Theatre before Woodin could start his. On December 21, the first meeting for the club at Elsinore Theatre was attended by around 1,200 children. On July 24, 1930, Joseph Conley, president of King Features Syndicate, wrote to the Disney studio and asked the company to produce a Mickey Mouse comic strip; production started in November and samples were sent to King Features, which approved them. On December 16, 1930, the Walt Disney Studios partnership was reorganized as a corporation with the name Walt Disney Productions, Limited, which had a merchandising division named Walt Disney Enterprises, and subsidiaries called Disney Film Recording Company, Limited and Liled Realty and Investment Company; the latter of which managed real estate holdings. Walt and his wife held 60 percent (6,000 shares) of the company, and Roy owned 40 percent.

The comic strip Mickey Mouse debuted on January 13, 1930, in New York Daily Mirror and by 1931, the strip was published in 60 newspapers in the U.S., and in twenty other countries. After realizing releasing merchandise based on the characters would generate more revenue for the company, in New York, a man asked  Walt for the license to put Mickey Mouse on writing tablets he was manufacturing for $300. Walt agreed and Mickey Mouse became the first licensed character. In 1933, Walt asked Kay Karmen, the owner of an Kansas City advertising firm, to run Disney's merchandising; Karmen agreed and transformed Disney's merchandising. Within a year, Kamen had 40 licenses for Mickey Mouse and within two years, had made $35 million worth of sales. In 1934, Walt said he made more money from the merchandising of Mickey Mouse than from the character's films. 

Later, the Waterbury Clock Company created a Mickey Mouse watch, which became so popular it saved the company from bankruptcy during the Great Depression. During a promotional event at Macy's, 11,000 Mickey Mouse watches sold in one day; and within two years, two-and-a-half million watches were sold. As Mickey Mouse become a heroic character rather than a mischievous mouse, Disney needed another character that could produce gags. Walt invited radio presenter Clarence Nash to the animation studio; Walt wanted to use Nash to play Donald Duck, a talking duck character that would be the studio's new gag character. Donald Duck made his first appearance in 1934 in The Wise Little Hen. Though he did not become popular as quickly as Mickey Mouse had, Donald Duck had a featured role in Donald and Pluto (1936), and eventually was given his own series.

After a disagreement with Columbia Pictures about the Silly Symphonies cartoons, Walt signed a distribution contract with United Artists from 1932 to 1937 to distribute the series. In 1932, Disney signed an exclusive contract with Technicolor to produce cartoons in color until the end of 1935, beginning with the Silly Symphonies short Flowers and Trees (1932). The film was the first full-color cartoon and later that year, it won the Academy Award for the Best Cartoon. In 1933, The Three Little Pigs, another popular Silly Symphonies short, was released and also won the Academy Award for Best Cartoon. The song from the film "Who's Afraid of the Big Bad Wolf?", which was composed by Frank Churchill—who wrote other Silly Symphonies songs—became popular and remained so  throughout the 1930s, and became one of the best-known Disney songs. Other Silly Symphonies films won the Best Cartoon award from 1931 to 1939, except for 1938, when another Disney film Ferdinand the Bull won it.

1934–1949: The Golden Age of Animation, strike, and World War II 

In 1934, Walt decided to make the feature-length animated film Snow White and the Seven Dwarfs— Walt Disney Productions' first full-length feature film. He told his animators by acting out the story. Roy tried to stop Walt from making it, saying it would bankrupt the studio, and in Hollywood it was called "Disney's Folly", but Walt continued production on the film. He took a realistic approach to the film and created scenes as though they were live action. While making the film, the company created the multiplane camera, which was pieces of glass upon which drawings were placed at different distances to create an illusion of depth in the backgrounds. After United Artists attempted to attain future television rights to the Disney shorts, Walt signed a distribution contract with RKO Radio Pictures on March 2, 1936. Walt Disney Productions exceeded its original budget of $150,000  for Snow White and the Seven Dwarfs by ten times; it production eventually cost the company $1.5 million.

Snow White and the Seven Dwarfs took three years to make, debuting on December 12, 1937. It became the highest-grossing film of all time up to that point, grossing $8 million ; after several re-releases, the film grossed a total of $998,440,000 in the U.S. adjusted for inflation. After the profits of Snow White and the Seven Dwarfs, Disney financed the construction of a new studio complex of 51 acres (20.6 ha) in Burbank, California, which the company fully moved into in 1940. On April 2 of the same year, Disney had its initial public offering, with the common stock remaining with Walt and his family. Walt did not want to go public but the company needed the money.

Shortly before Snow White and the Seven Dwarfs release, work began on the company's next films Pinocchio and Bambi; Bambi was postponed. Pinocchio won the Academy Awards for Best Song and Best Score, and was said to have made groundbreaking achievements in animation. Pinocchio, however, performed poorly at the box office upon its release on February 23, 1940, because its international releases were prevented due to World War II.

The company's next film Fantasia also performed poorly at the box office but during its production, he company made advancements in cinema technology, inventing Fantasound, an early surround sound system, for the film's soundtrack, making it the first commercial film to be shown in stereo. In 1941, Walt Disney Studio experienced a major setback when 300 of its 800 animators, led mainly by one of the company's top animators Art Babbitt, went on strike for five weeks for unionization and higher pay. Walt thought the strikers were secretly communists and he fired many of the studios' animators, including some of its best ones. Roy Disney tried to persuade the company's main distributors to invest in the studio and to secure more production funds for the studio, which could no longer afford to offset production costs with employee layoffs, but was unsuccessful. During the premiere of The Reluctant Dragon (1941), Disney's fourth film, Robert Benchley toured the company's studio; protesters from the strike arrived and the film was $100,000 short of its production cost.

While negotiations with the strikers were underway, Walt accepted an offer from the Office of the Coordinator of Inter-American Affairs to make a goodwill visit, along with some of his animators, to South America, ensuring Disney would be absent during the deal because he knew the results would not be in his favor. During the twelve-week visit, the animators began plotting for films and were inspired by local music.  As a result of the strike, Federal mediators compelled the studio to recognize the Screen Cartoonist's Guild and several animators left the company, leaving it with 694 employees. To recover from their financial losses, Disney, hurriedly and with a lower budget, created the studio's fifth animated film Dumbo, which performed well at the box office and made a much-needed financial gain for the company. After the bombing of Pearl Harbor, many of the companies animators would be drafted into the army. Later, 500 United States Army soldiers occupied the studio for eight months to protect a nearby Lockheed aircraft plant. While they were there, the soldiers fixed equipment in large soundstages and converted storage sheds into ammunition depots. 
On December 8, 1941, the United States Navy asked Walt to create propaganda films to gain support for the war. He agreed and signed a contract with the navy for 20 war-related shorts for $90,000. Most of the company's employees worked on the project and created films such as Victory Through Air Power, and included some of the company's characters in several of the films.

In August, 1942, Bambi was released as Disney's sixth animated film and performed poorly at the box office. In 1943, following the trip to South America, the studio made Saludos Amigos and The Three Caballeros; the two films are package films, several short cartoons grouped together to make a feature film. Both films performed poorly upon their releases. Disney made more package films, including Make Mine Music (1946), Fun and Fancy Free (1947), Melody Time (1948), and The Adventures of Ichabod and Mr. Toad (1949), to try to recover from its financial losses. The studio started production on less-expensive live-action films with a mixture of animation, starting with Song of the South which became Disney's most controversial film. Because the company was short of money, in 1944, it planned to re-release its feature films to create much-needed revenue. In 1948, Walt Disney Studio began the nature documentary series,True-Life Adventures, which ran until 1960 and won eight Academy Awards. In 1949, during production of the animated film Cinderella (1950), the Walt Disney Music Company was founded to help with profits for merchandising, hoping the music from Cinderella would be a hit.

1950–1967: Live-action films, television, Disneyland, and Walt Disney's death 

In 1950, Cinderella, Disney's first animated film in eight years, was released and was considered a return to form for the studio. With a production cost of costing $2.2 million, it was Disney's most financially successful film since Snow White and the Seven Dwarfs, making $8 million in its first year. Walt had not been as involved as he was with earlier films because he was distracted with trains and visited England to make Disney's first fully live-action film Treasure Island (1950). Because Treasure Island was a success, Walt returned to England to produce The Story of Robin Hood and His Merry Men. In 1950, the television industry began to grow, and on 25 December, NBC aired the company's first television production "One Hour in Wonderland", which was a promotional program for Disney's next animated film Alice in Wonderland (1951) and sponsored by Coca-Cola. While Walt was in England, Alice in Wonderland was released; it was financially unsuccessful, falling $1 million short of the production budget. Upon his return, Walt started planning the construction of an amusement park called Mickey Mouse Park on an eight-acre (3.2 ha) site near the studio; its attractions would include a steamboat ride but business interrupted the plan and production for a third British film The Sword and the Rose began. Walt supervised the film's production, which was financed by a new subsidiary called Walt Disney British Films Limited.

According to Walt, he had the idea of an amusement park during a visit to Griffith Park with his daughters. He said he watched them ride a carousel there and that he thought there "should be ... some kind of amusement enterprise built where the parents and the children could have fun together". Walt changed the planned amusement park's name to  Disneylandia, then to Disneyland.  Because Roy was doubtful about the park, Walt formed a new company called Walt Disney Enterprise on December 16, 1952, to fund the park. Shortly after, its name was changed to Walt Disney Incorporated, and again to WED Enterprises (now Walt Disney Imagineering) in November 1953. He hired a group of designers to work on the plans; these became  known as "Imagineers". Walt and his friends visited parks in the U.S. and Europe to get ideas on how to build one. His plan to build the park in Burbank near the studio quickly changed when he realized that 8 (3.2 ha) acres would not be enough land. Walt acquired 160 acres (65 ha) of orange groves in Anaheim, southeast of Los Angeles in neighboring Orange County, at $6,200 per acre to build the park. Construction on the park began on July 12, 1954; Walt wanted it to be completed by 1955, with storytelling attractions and areas, as well as being clean and perfect. By the time the park opened, it cost the company $17 million to construct.

In February 1953, Disney's next animated film Peter Pan was a financial success but Walt wanted to improve the standard of animation without raising the cost. When Disney wanted to create The Living Desert, a feature with two short films, for the True-Life documentary, RKO's lawyer believed it would break the 1948 antitrust Supreme Court ruling if it was sold as a package. Roy thought the company would thrive without RKO and Disney created its own distribution company Buena Vista Distribution, named after the street where the studio was located. In 1954, Disney's first American live action film 20,000 Leagues Under the Sea, which was one of the first films to use CinemaScope, was released. From the early-to-mid 1950s, Walt began to devote less attention to the animation department, entrusting most of its operations to his key animators the Nine Old Men, although he was always present at story meetings. Instead, he started concentrating on television, Disneyland, and other company affairs.

To finance the construction of Disneyland, Walt sold his home at Smoke Tree Ranch in Palm Springs Ca. and the company promoted it with a television series. After unsuccessful negotiations with NBC and CBS to sign on, in 1954, American Broadcasting Company (ABC) contracted with Disney for an hour-long, weekly series starting in October called Disneyland an anthology series consisting of animated cartoons, live-action features, and other materials from the studio's library; and would depict four segments of the amusement park's four areas. The series was a success and garnered over 50% of viewers in its time slot, along with increasing audiences and praise from critics. In August, Walt formed another company Disneyland, Inc. to finance the theme park, with Walt Disney Productions, Walt, Western Publishing—which had been the publisher of Disney books for over twenty years—and ABC all holding stock in the company.

In October, with the success of Disneyland, ABC allowed Disney to produce The Mickey Mouse Club, a variety show for children; the show included a daily Disney cartoon, a children's newsreel, and a talent show. It was presented by a host, and talented children and adults called "Mousketeers" and "Mooseketeers", respectively. After the first season, over ten million children and five million adults watched it daily; and two million Mickey Mouse ears, which the cast wore, were sold. On December 15, 1954, Disneyland aired an episode of the five-part miniseries Davy Crockett, which stars Fess Parker as the title character.  According to writer Neal Gabler, "[It] became an overnight national sensation", selling 10 million Crockett coonskin caps. The show's theme song "The Ballad of Davy Crockett" became a part of American pop culture, selling 10 million records. Los Angeles Times called it "the greatest merchandising fad the world had ever seen". In June 1955, Disney's 15th animated film Lady and the Tramp was released and performed better at the box office than any other Disney films since Snow White and the Seven Dwarfs.

Disneyland opened on Sunday, July 17, 1955. Only Main Street and rides in some of the "lands" were completed, a total of 20 attractions. Entry to the park cost $1 and guests had to pay for each individual ride. They were ready for 11,000 guests but around 28,000 people arrived due to sales of counterfeit tickets. The opening was aired on ABC with actors Art Linkletter, Bob Cummings, and Ronald Reagan, who were all friends of Walt, hosting it. It garnered over 90 million viewers, becoming the most-watched live broadcast to that date. The opening was disastrous, and was dubbed as "Black Sunday" by the employees. Restaurants ran out of food, the Mark Twain Riverboat began to sink, several rides malfunctioned, and the drinking fountains were not working in the 100 °F. (38 °C) heat. Within its first week of being open, Disneyland had had 161,657 visitors, and by its first month the park had over 20,000 visitors each day. After its first year, 3.6 million people had visited the park, and after its second year, four million more guests came, making it more popular than the Grand Canyon and Yellowstone National Park. That year, the company earned a gross total of $24.5 million compared to the $11 million the previous year.

Though Walt focused more of the park than on films, the company produced an average of five releases per year throughout the 1950s and 1960s.  The animated feature films included Sleeping Beauty (1959), One Hundred and One Dalmatians (1961), and The Sword in the Stone (1963). Sleeping Beauty was a financial loss for the company, and at $6 million, it had the highest production costs for a film up to that point. One Hundred and One Dalmatians introduced  animation technique using the xerography process to electromagnetically transfer the drawings to animation cels. In 1956, the Sherman brothers, Robert and Richard, were asked to produce a theme song for the television series Zorro. The company later hired them as exclusive staff songwriters, an arrangement that lasted 10 years. They wrote many of the songs for Disney's films and theme parks, and several of them were commercial hits. In the late 1950s, Disney ventured into comedy with the live-action films The Shaggy Dog (1959), which became the highest-grossing film in the U.S. and Canada for Disney at over $9 million, and The Absent Minded Professor (1961), both starring Fred MacMurray.

Disney also made several live-action films based on children's books including Pollyanna (1960) and Swiss Family Robinson (1960). Child actor Hayley Mills starred in Pollyanna, for which she won an Academy Juvenile Award. Mills also starred in five other Disney films, including a dual role as the twins in The Parent Trap (1961). Another child actor Kevin Corcoran was a prominent figure in many of Disney's live-action films, first appearing in a serial for The Mickey Mouse Club, where he would play a boy named Moochie. He worked alongside Mills in Pollyanna, and starred in features such as Old Yeller (1957), Toby Tyler (1960), and Swiss Family Robinson. In 1964, the live action/animation musical film Mary Poppins was released and became the year's highest-grossing film. It won five Academy Awards, including Best Actress for Julie Andrews as Poppins and Best Song for the Sherman Brothers', who also won Best Score for the film's "Chim Chim Cher-ee".

Throughout the 1960s, Dean Jones, whom The Guardian called "the figure who most represented Walt Disney Productions in the 1960s", starred in ten Disney films, including That Darn Cat! (1965), The Ugly Dachshund (1966), and The Love Bug (1968). Disney's last child actor of the 1960s was Kurt Russell, who had signed a ten-year contract with the company.  He featured in films such as The Computer Wore Tennis Shoes (1969), The Horse in the Gray Flannel Suit (1968) alongside Dean Jones, The Barefoot Executive (1971), and The Strongest Man in the World (1975).

In late 1959, Walt had an idea to build another park in Palm Beach, Florida, called the City of Tomorrow, a city that would be full of technological improvements. In 1964, the company chose land southwest of Orlando, Florida to build the park and quickly acquired 27,000 acres (10,927 ha) of land for it. On November 15, 1965, Walt, along with Roy and Florida's governor Haydon Burns, announced plans for another park called Disney World, which included Magic Kingdom—‌a larger version of Disneyland‍—‌and the City of Tomorrow, which would be at the park's center. By 1967, the company had made several expansions to Disneyland, and more rides were added in 1966 and 1967, at a cost of $20 million. The new rides included Walt Disney's Enchanted Tiki Room, which was the first attraction to use audio-animatronics; Walt Disney's Carousel of Progress, which debuted at the 1964 New York World's Fair before moving to Disneyland in 1967; and Dumbo the Flying Elephant, which opened a month after the park. 

On November 20, 1964, Walt sold most of WED Enterprise to Walt Disney Productions for $3.75 million after being persuaded to by Roy, who thought Walt having his own company would cause legal problems. Walt formed a new company called Retlaw to handle his personnel business, primarily Disneyland Railroad and  Disneyland Monorail. When the company started looking for a sponsor for the project, Walt renamed the City of Tomorrow Experimental Prototype Community of Tomorrow (EPCOT). Walt, who had been a heavy smoker since World War I, experienced deteriorating health; he visited St. Joseph Hospital on November 2, 1966, for tests. Doctors discovered a walnut-sized spot on his left lung and a few days later, they found the lung was cancerous and removed it. Walt was released from hospital after two weeks. He died on December 15, 1966, at the age of 65, of circulatory collapse caused by lung cancer.

 1967–1984: Roy O. Disney's leadership and death, Walt Disney World, animation industry decline, and Touchstone Pictures 
In 1967, the last two films Walt had worked on were released; the animated film The Jungle Book, which was Disney's most successful film for the next two decades, and the live-action musical The Happiest Millionaire. After Walt's death, the company largely abandoned the animation industry but make several live-action films. Its animation staff declined from 500 to 125 employees, with the company only hiring 21 people from 1970 to 1977. 

Disney's first post-Walt animated film The Aristocats was released in 1970; according to Dave Kehr of Chicago Tribune, "the absence of his [Walt's] hand is evident". The following year, the anti-fascist musical Bedknobs and Broomsticks was released and won the Oscar for Best Special Visual Effects. At the time of Walt's death, Roy was ready to retire but wanted to keep Walt's legacy alive; he became the first CEO and chairman of the company. In May 1967, Roy had legislation passed by Florida's legislatures to grant Disney World its own quasi-government agency in an area called Reedy Creek Improvement District. Roy also changed Disney World's name to Walt Disney World to remind people it was Walt's dream. Over time, EPCOT became less of the City of Tomorrow and developed more into another amusement park.

After 18 months of construction at a cost of around $400 million, Walt Disney World's first park the Magic Kingdom, along with Disney's Contemporary Resort and Disney's Polynesian Resort, opened on October 1, 1971, with 10,400 visitors. A parade with over 1,000 band members, 4,000 Disney entertainers, and a choir from the U.S. Army marched down Main Street. The icon of the park was the Cinderella Castle. Three months later on Thanksgiving day, cars traveling to the Magic Kingdom caused traffic jams along interstate roads.

On December 21, 1971, Roy died of cerebral hemorrhage at St. Joseph Hospital. After Roy's death, Donn Tatum, a senior executive and former president of Disney, became the first non-Disney-family-member to become CEO and chairman of the board. Card Walker, who had been with the company since 1938, became its president. By June 30, 1973, Disney had over 23,000 employees and had a gross revenue of $257,751,000 over a nine-month period, compared to the year before when it made $220,026,000. In November, Disney released the animated film Robin Hood (1973), which became Disney's biggest international-grossing movie at $18 million. Throughout the 1970s, Disney released several more live-action films such as The Computer Wore Tennis Shoes sequel Now You See Him, Now You Don't; The Love Bug sequels Herbie Rides Again (1974) and Herbie Goes to Monte Carlo (1977); Escape to Witch Mountain (1975); and Freaky Friday (1976). In 1976, Card Walker became CEO of the company, with Tatum remaining as chairman until 1980, when Walker replaced him. In 1977, Roy E. Disney, Roy O. Disney's son and the only Disney working for the company, resigned from his job as an executive because of disagreements with the company's decisions.

In 1977, Disney released the successful animated film The Rescuers, which grossed $48 million at the box office. The live-acton/animated musical Pete's Dragon was released in 1977, grossing $16 million in the U.S. and Canada, but was considered a disappointment to the company. In 1979, Disney's first PG-rated film and most expensive film up to that point at $26 million dollars The Black Hole was released, showing Disney could use special effects. It grossed $35 million, which was a disappointment to the company, which thought it would be a hit like Star Wars (1977). The Black Hole was a response to other Science fiction films of the era. 

In September, 12 animators, which was over 15 percent of the department, resigned from the studio. Led by Don Bluth, they left because of a conflict with the training program and the atmosphere at the studio, and started their own company Don Bluth Productions. In 1981, Disney released Dumbo to VHS and Alice in Wonderland the following year, leading Disney to eventually release all its films on home media. On July 24, Walt Disney's World on Ice, a two-year tour of ice shows featuring Disney charters, made its premiere at the Brendan Byrne Meadowlands Arena after Disney licensed its characters to Feld Entertainment. The same month, Disney's animated film The Fox and the Hound was released and became the highest-grossing animated film to that point at $39.9 million. It was the company's first film that did not involve Walt and was the last major work done by Disney's Nine Old Men, who were replaced with younger animators.

As profits for the company started to decline, on October 1, 1982, Epcot, then known as EPCOT Center, opened as the second theme park in Walt Disney World, with around 10,000 people in attendance during the opening. The park cost over $900 million to construct, and consisted of the Future World pavilion and the World Showcase representing Mexico, China, Germany, Italy, America, Japan, France, the United Kingdom, and Canada; Morocco and Norway were added in 1984 and 1988, respectively. The animation industry continued to decline and 69% of the company's profits were from its theme parks; in 1982, there were 12 million visitors to Walt Disney World, a figure that declined by 5% the following June. On July 9, 1982, Disney released Tron, one of the first films to extensively use computer-generated imagery (CGI). Tron was a big influence on other CGI movies, although it received mixed reviews. In total, in 1982, the company lost $27 million. 

On April 15, 1983, Disney's first park outside the U.S. Tokyo Disneyland, opened in Urayasu, Japan. Costing around $1.4 billion, construction of the park started in 1979 when Disney and The Oriental Land Company agreed to build a park together. Within its first ten years, the park had over 140 million visitors. After an investment of $100 million, on April 18, Disney started a pay-to-watch cable television channel called Disney Channel, a 16-hours-a-day service showing Disney films, twelve programs, and two magazines shows for adults. Although it was expected to do well, the company lost $48.3 million after its first year, with around 916,000 subscribers.

In 1983, Walt's son-in-law Ron W. Miller, who had been president of the company since 1978, became its CEO, and Raymond Watson became chairman. Miller wanted the studio to produce more content for mature audiences, and as a result, Disney founded the film distribution label Touchstone Pictures to produce movies geared toward adults and teenagers in 1984. Splash (1984) was the first film released under the label, and was a much-needed success for the studio, grossing over $6.1 million in its first week of screening. Later, Disney's first R-rated film Down and Out in Beverly Hills (1986) was released and was another hit for the company, grossing $62 million. The following year, Disney's first PG-13 rated film Adventures in Babysitting was released. In 1984, Saul Steinberg attempted to buy out the company, holding 11.1% of the stocks. He offered to buy 49% of the company for $1.3 billion or the entire company for $2.75 billion. Disney, which had less than $10 million, rejected Steinberg's offer and offered to buy all of his stock for $325.5 million. Steinberg agreed, and Disney paid it all with part of a $1.3 billion bank loan, putting the company $866 million in debt.

 1984–2005: Michael Eisner's leadership, the Disney Renaissance, merger, and acquisitions 

In 1984, the company's shareholders Roy E. Disney, Sid Bass, Lillian and Diane Disney, and Irwin L. Jacobs—who together owned about 35.5% of the shares of the company, forced out CEO Miller and replaced him with Michael Eisner, a former president of Paramount Pictures, and also appointed Frank Wells as president. Eisner's first act at Disney was to make it a major film studio, which at the time it was not considered. Eisner appointed Jeffrey Katzenberg as chairman and Roy E. Disney as head of the animation division. Eisner wanted the company to produce an animated film every 18 months  rather than every four years, as the company had been doing. To help with the film division, the company started making Saturday-morning cartoons to create new Disney characters for merchandising, and produced several films through Touchstone. Under Eisner, Disney became more involved with television, creating Touchstone Television and producing the television situation comedy The Golden Girls, which was a hit. The company also spent $15 million promoting its theme parks, raising visitor numbers by 10%. In 1984, Disney produced The Black Cauldron, then the most-expensive animated movie at $40 million, their first animated film to feature computer-generated imagery, and also their first PG-rated animated film because of its adult themes. The film was a box-office failure, leading the company to move the animation department from the studio in Burbank into a warehouse in Glendale, California. The film-financing partnership Silver Screen Partners II, which was organized in 1985, financed films for Disney with $193 million. In January 1987, Silver Screen Partners III began financing movies for Disney with $300 million raised by E.F. Hutton, the largest amount raised for a film-financing limited partnership. Silver Screen IV was also set up to finance Disney's studios.

In 1986, the company changed its name from Walt Disney Productions to The Walt Disney Company, stating the old name only referred to the film industry. With Disney's animation industry declining, the animation department needed its next movie The Great Mouse Detective to be a success. It grossed $25 million at the box office, becoming a much-needed financial success for the company. To generate more revenue from merchandising, the company opened its first retail store Disney Store in Glendale in 1987. Because of its success, the company opened two more stores in California, and by 1990, it had 215 stores throughout the U.S. In 1989, the company garnered $411 million in revenue and made a profit of $187 million. In 1987, the company signed an agreement with the Government of France to build a resort named Euro Disneyland in Paris; it would consist of two theme parks named Disneyland Park and Walt Disney Studios Park, a golf course, and six hotels.

In 1988, Disney's 27th animated film Oliver & Company was released the same day as that of former Disney animator Don Bluth's The Land Before Time. Oliver & Company out-competed The Land Before Time, becoming the first animated film to gross over $100 million in its initial release, and the highest-grossing animated film in its initial run. At the time, Disney became the box-office-leading Hollywood studio for the first time, with films such as Who Framed Roger Rabbit (1988), Three Men and a Baby (1987), and Good Morning, Vietnam (1987). The company's gross revenue went from $165 million in 1983 to $876 million in 1987, and operating income went from −$33 million in 1983 to +130 million in 1987. The studio's net income rose by 66%, along with a 26% growth in revenue. Los Angeles Times called Disney's recovery "a real rarity in the corporate world". On May 1, 1989, Disney opened Disney-MGM Studios, its third amusement park at Walt Disney World, and later became Hollywood Studios. The new park demonstrated to visitors the movie-making process, until 2008, when it was changed to make guests feel as though they are in movies. Following the opening of  Disney-MGM Studios, Disney opened the water park Typhoon Lagoon on June 1, 1989; in 2008, it had 2.8 million visitors. Also in 1989, Disney signed an agreement-in-principle to acquire The Jim Henson Company from its founder Jim Henson. The deal included Henson's programming library and Muppet characters—excluding the Muppets created for Sesame Street—as well as Henson's personal creative services. Henson, however, died in May 1990 before the deal was completed, resulting in the two companies terminating merger negotiations the following December.

On November 17, 1989, Disney released The Little Mermaid, which is considered to be the start of the Disney Renaissance, a period in which the company released hugely successful and critically acclaimed animated films. During its release, it became the animated film with the highest gross from its initial run and garnered $233 million at the box office; it also won two Academy Awards; Best Original Score and Best Original Song for "Under the Sea". During the Disney Renaissance, composer Alan Menken and lyricist Howard Ashman wrote several Disney songs until Ashman died in 1991. Together they wrote six songs that were nominated for Academy Awards; with two winning songs—"Under the Sea" and "Beauty and the Beast". To produce music geared for the mainstream, including music for movie soundtracks, Disney founded the recording label Hollywood Records on January 1, 1990. In September 1990, Disney arranged for financing of up to $200 million by a unit of Nomura Securities for Interscope films made for Disney. On October 23, Disney formed Touchwood Pacific Partners, which replaced the Silver Screen Partnership series as the company's movie studios' primary source of funding. Disney's first animated sequel The Rescuers Down Under was released on November 16, 1990, and was created using Computer Animation Production System (CAPS), a digital software that was developed by Disney and Pixar—the computer division of Lucasfilm—becoming the first feature film to be entirely created digitally. Although the film struggled in the box office, grossing $47.4 million, it received positive reviews from critics. In 1991, Disney and Pixar agreed to a deal to make three films together, the first one being Toy Story.

Dow Jones & Company, wanting to replace three companies in its industrial average, chose Disney in May 1991, statement Disney "reflects the importance of entertainment and leisure activities in the economy". Disney's next animated film Beauty and the Beast was released on November 13, 1991, and grossed nearly $430 million. It was the first animated film to win a Golden Globe for Best Picture, and it received six Academy Award nominations, becoming the first animated film to be nominated for Best Picture Oscar; it won Best Score, Best Sound, and Best Song for "Beauty and the Beast". The film was critically acclaimed, with some critics considering it to be the best Disney film. To coincide with the 1992 release of The Mighty Ducks, Disney founded National Hockey League team The Mighty Ducks of Anaheim. Disney's next animated feature Aladdin was released on November 11, 1992, and grossed $504 million, becoming the highest-grossing animated film up to that point, and the first animated film to gross a half-billion dollars. It won two Academy Awards—Best Song for "A Whole New World" and Best Score; and "A Whole New World" was the first-and-only Disney song to win the Grammy for Song of the Year.  For $60 million, Disney broadened its range of mature-audience films by acquiring independent film distributor Miramax Films in 1993. The same year, in a joint venture with The Nature Conservancy, Disney purchased 8,500 acres (3,439 ha) of Everglades headwaters in Florida to protect native animals and plant species, establishing the Disney Wilderness Preserve.

On April 3, 1994, Frank Wells died in a helicopter crash; he, Eisner, and Katzenberg helped the company's market value go from $2 billion to $22 billion since taking office in 1984. On June 15 the same year, The Lion King was released and was a massive success, becoming the second-highest-grossing film of all time behind Jurassic Park and the highest-grossing animated film of all time, with a gross total of  $968.5 million. It was critically praised and garnered two Academy Awards—Best Score and Best Song for "Can You Feel the Love Tonight". Soon after its release, Katzenberg left the company after Eisner refused to promote him to president. After leaving, he co-founded film studio DreamWorks SKG. Wells was later replaced with one of Eisner's friends Michael Ovitz on August 13, 1995. In 1994, Disney wanted to buy one of the major U.S. television networks ABC, NBC, or CBS, which would give the company guaranteed distribution for its programming. Eisner planned to buy NBC but the deal was canceled because General Electric wanted to keep a majority stake. In 1994, Disney's annual revenue reached $10.1 billion, 48% coming from the film industry, 34% from theme parks, and 18% from merchandising. Disney's total net income was up 25% from the previous year at $1.1 billion. Grossing over $346 million, Pocahontas was released on June 16, garnering the Academy Awards for Best Musical or Comedy Score and Best Song for "Colors of the Wind". Pixar's and Disney's first co-release was the first-ever fully computer-generated film Toy Story, which was released on November 19, 1995, to critical acclaim and an end-run gross total of $361 million. The film won the Special Achievement Academy Award and was the first animated film to be nominated for Best Original Screenplay.

In 1995, Disney announced the $19 billion acquisition of television network Capital Cities/ABC Inc., which at the time was the second-largest corporate takeover in U.S. history. Through the deal, Disney would obtain broadcast network ABC, an 80% majority stake in sports networks ESPN and ESPN 2, 50% in Lifetime Television, a majority stake of DIC Entertainment, and a 37.5% minority stake in A&E Television Networks. Following the deal, the company started Radio Disney, a youth-focused radio program on ABC Radio Network, on November 18, 1996. The Walt Disney Company launched its official website disney.com on February 22, 1996, mainly to promote its theme parks and merchandise. On June 19 the same year, the company's next animated film The Hunchback of Notre Dame was released, grossing $325 million at the box office. Because Ovitz's management style was different from Eisner's, Ovitz was fired as the company's president in 1996. Disney lost a $10.4 million lawsuit in September 1997 to Marsu B.V. over Disney's failure to produce as contracted 13 half-hour Marsupilami cartoon shows. Instead, Disney felt other internal "hot properties" deserved the company's attention. Disney, which since 1996 had owned a 25% stake in World Series baseball team California Angels, bought out the team in 1998 for $110 million, renaming it Anaheim Angels and renovating their stadium for $100 million. Hercules (1997) was released on June 13, and underperformed at the box office compared to earlier films, grossing $252 million. On February 24, Disney and Pixar signed a ten-year contract to make five films together with Disney as the distributor. They would share the cost, profits, and logo credits, calling the films Disney-Pixar productions. During the Disney Renaissance, film division Touchstone also saw success with film such as Pretty Woman (1990), which has the highest number of ticket sales in the U.S. for a romantic comedy and grossed $432 million; Sister Act (1992), which was one of the more financially successful comedies of the early 1990s, grossing $231 million; action film Con Air (1997), which grossed $224 million; and the highest-grossing film of 1998 at $553 million Armageddon (1998).

At Disney World, the company opened  Disney's Animal Kingdom, the largest theme park in the world covering 580 acres (230 ha) on Earth Day, April 22, 1998. It had six animal-themed lands, over 2,000 animals, and the Tree of Life at its center. Receiving positive reviews, Disney's next animated films Mulan and Disney-Pixar film A Bug's Life were released on June 5 and November 20, 1998, respectively. Mulan became the yea's sixth-highest-grossing film at $304 million, and A Bug's Life was the year's fifth-highest at $363 million. In a $770-million transaction, on June 18, Disney bought a 43% stake of Internet search engine Infoseek for $70 million, also giving it Infoseek-acquired Starwave. Starting web portal Go.com in a joint venture with Infoseek on January 12, 1999, Disney acquired the rest of Infoseek later that year. After unsuccessful negotiations with cruise lines Carnival and Royal Caribbean International, in 1994, Disney announced it would start its own cruise-line operation in 1998. The first two ships of the Disney Cruise Line would be named Disney Magic and Disney Wonder, and would be built by Fincantieri in Italy. To accompany the cruises, Disney bought Gorda Cay as the line's private island, and spent $25 million remodeling it and renaming it Castaway Cay. On July 30, 1998, Disney Magic set sail as the line's first voyage. 

Marking the end of the Disney Renaissance, Tarzan (1999) was released on June 12, garnering $448 million at the box office and critical acclaim; it also claimed the Academy Award for Best Original Song for Phil Collins' "You'll Be in My Heart". Disney-Pixar film Toy Story 2 was released on November 13, garnering praise and $511 million at the box office. To replace Ovitz, Eisner named ABC network chief Bob Iger Disney's president and chief operating officer on January 25, 2000. In November, Disney sold DIC Entertainment back to Andy Heward, although still doing business with it. Disney had another huge success with Pixar when they released Monsters, Inc. in 2001. Later, Disney bought children's cable network Fox Family Worldwide for $3 billion and the assumption of $2.3 billion in debt. The deal also included 76% stake in Fox Kids Europe, Latin American channel Fox Kids, more than 6,500 episodes from Saban Entertainment's programming library, and Fox Family Channel. In 2001, Disney's operations had with a net loss of $158 million after a decline in viewership of the ABC television network, as well as decreased tourism due to the September 11 attacks. Disney earnings in fiscal 2001 were $120 million compared with the previous year's $920 million. To help reduce costs, Disney announced it would be lay off 4,000 employees and close 300 to 400 Disney Store outlets. After winning the World Series in 2002, Disney sold Anaheim Angels to businessman Arturo Moreno for $180 million in 2003. In 2003, Disney became the first studio to garner $3 billion in a year at the box office. The same year, Roy Disney announced his retirement because of the way the company was being run, calling on Eisner to retire; the same week, board member Stanley Gold retired for the same reasons. Gold and Disney formed the "Save Disney" campaign.

In 2004, at the company's annual meeting, the shareholders in a 43% vote voted Eisner out of his position as chairman of the board. On March 4, George J. Mitchell, who was a member of the board, was named as Eisner's replacement. In April, Disney purchased the Muppets franchise from the Jim Henson Company for $75 million, founding Muppets Holding Company, LLC. Following the success of Disney-Pixar films Finding Nemo (2003), which became the second highest-grossing animated film of all time at $936 million, and The Incredibles (2004), Pixar looked for a new distributor once its deal with Disney ended in 2004. Disney sold the loss-making Disney Stores chain of 313 stores to Children's Place on October 20. Disney also sold the NHL team Mighty Ducks to Henry Samueli and his wife Susan in 2005. Roy E. Disney decided to rejoin the company and was given the role of consultant with the title "Director Emeritus".

 2005–2020: Bob Iger's leadership, expansion, and Disney+ 

In March 2005, Bob Iger, president of the company, became CEO of Disney after Eisner's retirement in September; Iger was officially named head of the company on October 1. Disney's eleventh theme park Hong Kong Disneyland opened on September 12, costing the company $3.5 billion to construct. On January 24, 2006, Disney began talks to acquire Pixar from Steve Jobs for $7.4 billion, and Iger appointed Pixar Chief creative officer (CCO) John Lasseter and president Ed Catmull the heads of the Walt Disney Animation Studios. A week later, Disney traded ABC Sports commentator Al Michaels to NBCUniversal in exchange for the rights to Oswald the Lucky Rabbit and 26 cartoons featuring the character. On February 6, the company announced it would be merging its ABC Radio networks and 22 stations with Citadel Broadcasting in a $2.7 billion deal, though which Disney acquired 52% of television broadcasting company Citadel Communications. The Disney Channel movie High School Musical aired and its soundtrack was certified triple platinum, becoming the first Disney Channel film to do so.

Disney's 2006 live-action film Pirates of the Caribbean: Dead Man's Chest was Disney's biggest hit to that date and the third-highest-grossing film ever, making a little over $1 billion at the box office. On June 28, the company announced it was replacing George Mitchell as chairman with one of its board members and former CEO of P&G John E. Pepper Jr. in 2007. The sequel High School Musical 2 was released in 2007 on Disney Channel and broke several cable rating records. In April 2007, the Muppets Holding Company was moved from Disney Consumer Products to the Walt Disney Studios division and renamed the Muppets Studios as part of efforts to relaunch the division. Pirates of the Caribbean: At World's End became the highest-grossing film of 2007 at $960 million. Disney-Pixar films Ratatouille (2007) and WALL-E (2008) were a tremendous success, with WALL-E winning the Oscar for Best Animated Feature. After acquiring most of Jetix Europe through the acquisition of Fox Family Worldwide, Disney bought the remainder of the company in 2008 for $318 million.

Bob Iger introduced D23 in 2009 as Disney's official fan club, with a biennial exposition event named D23 Expo. In February, Disney announced a distribution deal with DreamWorks Pictures to distribute 30 of their films over the next five years through Touchstone Pictures, with Disney getting 10% of the gross. The 2009 film Up garnered Disney $735 million at the box office, and the film won Best Animated Feature at the Academy Awards. Later that year, Disney launched a television channel named Disney XD, which was aimed at older children. The company bought Marvel Entertainment and its assets $4 billion in August, adding Marvel's comic-book characters to its merchandising line-up. In September, Disney partnered with News Corporation and NBCUniversal in a deal in which all parties would obtain 27% equity in streaming service Hulu, and Disney added ABC Family and Disney Channel to the streaming service. On December 16, Roy E. Disney died of stomach cancer; he was the last member of the Disney family to work for Disney. In March 2010, Haim Saban reacquired from Disney the Power Rangers franchise, including its 700-episode library, for around $100 million. Shortly after, Disney sold Miramax Films to an investment group headed by Ronald Tutor for $660 million. During that time, Disney released the live-action Alice in Wonderland and the Disney-Pixar film Toy Story 3, both of which grossed a little over $1 billion, making them the sixth-and-seventh films to do so; and Toy Story 3 became the first animated film to make over $1 billion and the highest-grossing animated film. That year, Disney became the first studio to release two $1-billion-dollar-earning films in one calendar year. In 2010, the company announced ImageMovers Digital, which it started in partnership with ImageMovers in 2007, would be closing by 2011.

The following year, Disney released its last traditionally animated film Winnie the Pooh to theaters. The release of Pirates of the Caribbean: On Stranger Tides garnered a little over $1 billion, making it the eighth film to do so and Disney's highest-grossing film internationally, as well as the third-highest ever. In January 2011, the size of Disney Interactive Studios was reduced and 200 employees were laid off. In April, Disney began constructing its new theme park Shanghai Disney Resort, costing $4.4 billion to build. In August, Bob Iger stated after the success of the Pixar and Marvel purchases, he and the Walt Disney Company were planning to "buy either new characters or businesses that are capable of creating great characters and great stories". On October 30, 2012, Disney announced it would be buying Lucasfilm for $4.05 billion from George Lucas. Through the deal, Disney gained access to franchises such as Star Wars, for which Disney said it would make a new film for every two-to-three years, first one being released in 2015. The deal also gave Disney access to the Indiana Jones franchise, visual-effects studio Industrial Light & Magic, and video game developer LucasArts. The sale was completed on December 21, 2012.

In early February 2012, Disney completed its acquisition of UTV Software Communications, expanding its market further into India and the rest of Asia. By March, Iger became Disney's chairman. Marvel film The Avengers became the third-highest-grossing film of all time with an initial-release gross of $1.3 billion. Making over $1.2 billion at the box office, the Marvel film Iron Man 3 was released in 2013. The same year, Disney's animated film Frozen was released and became the highest-grossing animated film of all time at $1.2 billion. Merchandising for the film became so popular it made the company $1 billion within a year, and a global shortage of merchandise for the film occurred. In March 2013, Iger announced Disney had no 2D animation films in development, and a month, later the hand-drawn animnation division was closed, and several veteran animators were laid off. On March 24, 2014, Disney acquired Maker Studios, an active multi-channel network on YouTube, for $950 million.

On February 5, 2015, Disney announced Thomas O. Staggs had been promoted to COO. In June, the company stated its consumer products and interactive divisions would merge to become new a subsidiary called Disney Consumer Products and Interactive Media. In August, Marvel Studios was reorganized and placed under the division Walt Disney Studios. The cmpany's 2015 releases include the successful animated film Inside Out, which grossed over $800 million, and the Marvel film Avengers: Age of Ultron, which grossed over $1.4 billion. Star Wars: The Force Awakens was released and grossed over $2 billion, making it the third-highest-grossing film of all time. In October, Disney announced the television channel ABC Family would be changing its name to Freeform in 2016 to broaden its audience. On April 4, 2016, Disney announced COO Thomas O. Staggs, who was thought to be next in line after Iger, would leave the company in May 2016, ending his 26-year career with Disney. Shanghai Disneyland opened on June 16, 2016, as the company's sixth theme-park resort. In a move to start a streaming service, Disney bought 33% of the stock in Major League Baseball technology company BAMtech for $1 billion in August. In 2016, four Disney film releases made over $1 billion; these were the animated film Zootopia, Marvel film Captain America: Civil War, Pixar film Finding Dory, and Rogue One: A Star Wars Story, making Disney the first studio to surpass $3 billion at the domestic box office. Disney also made an attempt to buy social media platform Twitter to market their content and merchandise but ultimately canceled the deal; Iger stated this was because he thought Disney would be taking on responsibilities it did not need and that it did not "feel Disney" to him.

On March 23, 2017, Disney announced Iger had agreed to a one-year extension of his term as CEO to July 2, 2019, and to remain with the company as a consultant for three years. On August 8, 2017, Disney announced it would be ending its distribution deal with streaming service Netflix, with the intent of launching its own streaming platform built with BAMtech's technology by 2019. During that time, Disney paid $1.5 billion to acquire a 75% stake in BAMtech. Disney also planned to start an ESPN streaming service with about "10,000 live regional, national, and international games and events a year" by 2018. In November, CCO John Lasseter said he would take a six-month absence from the company because of "missteps", which were later reported to be sexual misconduct allegations.  The same month, Disney and 21st Century Fox started negotiating a deal in which Disney would acquire most of Fox's assets. Beginning in March 2018, a strategic reorganization of the company led to the creation of business segments Disney Parks, Experiences and Products and Direct-to-Consumer & International. Parks & Consumer Products was primarily a merger of Parks & Resorts and Consumer Products & Interactive Media, while Direct-to-Consumer & International took over for Disney International and global sales, distribution, and streaming units from Disney-ABC TV Group and Studios Entertainment plus Disney Digital Network. CEO Iger described it as "strategically positioning our businesses for the future" while according to The New York Times, the reorganization was done in expectation of the 21st Century Fox purchase.

In 2017, two of Disney's films had revenues of over $1 billion; the live-action Beauty and the Beast and Star Wars: The Last Jedi. Disney launched subscription sports streaming service ESPN+ on April 12. In June 2018, Lasseter's departure from  the company by the end of the year was announced; he would stay as a consultant until then. To replace him; Disney promoted Jennifer Lee, co-director of Frozen and co-writer of Wreck-it Ralph (2012), as head of Walt Disney Animation Studios; and Pete Docter, who had been with Pixar since 1990 and directed Up, The Incredibles, and Inside Out, as head of Pixar. Later that month, Comcast offered to buy 21st Century Fox for $65 billion over Disney's $51 billion bid but withdrew its offer after Disney countered with a $71 billion bid; and Comcast shifted focus to buy Fox's Sky plc instead. Disney obtained an AntiTrust approval from the United States Department of Justice to acquire Fox. Disney again made $7 billion at the box office with three film that made $1 billion; Marvel films Black Panther and Avengers: Infinity War—the latter taking over $2 billion and becoming the fifth-highest-grossing film ever— and Pixar film Incredibles 2.

On March 20, 2019, Disney acquired 21st Century Fox's assets for $71.3 billion from Rupert Murdoch, making it the biggest acquisition in Disney's history. After the purchase, The New York Times described Disney as "an entertainment colossus the size of which the world has never seen". Through the acquisition, Disney gained 20th Century Fox; 20th Century Fox Television; Fox Searchlight Pictures; National Geographic Partners; Fox Networks Group; Indian television broadcaster Star India; and streaming services Star+, and Hotstar; and a 30% stake in Hulu, bringing its ownership on Hulu to 60%. Fox Corporation and its assets were excluded from the deal because of antitrust laws. Disney also became the first film studio to have seven films gross $1 billion: Marvel's Captain Marvel, the live action Aladdin, Pixar's Toy Story 4, the CGI remake of The Lion King, Star Wars: The Rise of Skywalker, and the highest-grossing film of all time up to that point at $2.797 billion Avengers: Endgame. On November 12, Disney's subscription video on-demand over-the-top streaming service Disney+, which had 500 movies and 7,500 episodes of television shows from Disney, Pixar, Marvel, Star Wars, National Geographic, and other brands, was launched in the United States, Canada, and the Netherlands. Within the first day, the streaming platform had over 10 million subscriptions; and by 2022 it had over 135 million subscribers, and was available in over 190 countries. At the beginning of 2020, Disney removed the Fox name from its assets, rebranding them as 20th Century Studios and Searchlight Pictures.

 2020–2022: Bob Chapek's leadership, and COVID-19 pandemic 

Bob Chapek, who had been with the company for 18 years and was chairman of Disney Parks, Experiences and Products, became CEO of Disney after Iger resigned on February 25, 2020. Iger said he would stay with the company as an executive chairmen until December 31, 2021, to help with its creative strategy. In April, Iger resumed operational duties as executive chairman to help the company during the COVID-19 pandemic, and Chapek was appointed to the board of directors. During the pandemic, Disney closed all of its theme parks, delayed the release of several movies, and stopped all operations on its cruise line. Due to the closures, Disney announced it would stop paying 100,000 employees but would still provide full healthcare benefits, and urged U.S. employees to apply for government benefits, saving the company $500 million a month. Iger gave up his $47.5 million salary and Chapek took a 50% salary reduction.

In the company's second fiscal quarter of 2020, Disney reported a $1.4 billion loss, with a fall in earnings of 91% to $475 million from the previous year's $5.4 billion. By August, two-thirds of the company was owned by large financial institutions. In September, the company dismissed 28,000 employees, 67% of whom were part-time workers, from its Parks, Experiences and Products division. Chairman of the division Josh D'Amaro wrote; "We initially hoped that this situation would be short-lived, and that we would recover quickly and return to normal. Seven months later, we find that has not been the case." Disney lost $4.7 billion in its fiscal third quarter of 2020. In November, Disney laid off another 4,000 employees from the Parks, Experiences and Products division, raising the total to 32,000 employees. The following month, Disney named Alan Bergman as chairman of its Disney Studios Content division to oversee its film studios. Due to the COVID-19 recession, Disney closed its animation studio Blue Sky Studios in February 2021. Touchstone Television ceased operations in December, and Disney announced in March 2021 it would be launching a new division called 20th Television Animation to focus on mature audiences. In April, Disney and Sony agreed to a multi-year licensing deal that would give Disney access to Sony's films from 2022 to 2026 to televise or stream on Disney+ once Sony's deal with Netflix ended. Although it performed poorly at the box office because of COVID-19, Disney's animated film Encanto (2021) was one of the biggest hits during the pandemic, with its song "We Don't Talk About Bruno" becoming popular.

After Iger's term as executive chairman ended on December 31, he announced he would also resign as chairman of the board. To replace him, the company brought in an operating executive at The Carlyle Group and current board member Susan Arnold as Disney's first female chairperson. On March 10, Disney ceased all operations in Russia because of Russia's invasion of Ukraine, and became was the first major Hollywood studio to halt the release of a major motion picture due to Russia's invasion; other movie studios followed soon after. In March 2022, around 60 employees protested the company's silence on the Florida Parental Rights in Education Act that was dubbed the Don't Say Gay Bill, and prohibits non-age-appropriate classroom instruction on sexual orientation and gender identity in Florida's public-school districts. The protest was dubbed the "Disney Do Better Walkout"; employees protested near a Disney Studios lot for about a week, and some other employees voiced their concerns through social media. Employees called on Disney to stop campaign contributions to Florida politicians who supported the bill, to help protect employees from it, and to stop construction at Walt Disney World in Florida. Chapek responded by stating the company had made a mistake by staying silent and said; "We pledge our ongoing support of the LGBTQ+ community".

Amid Disney's response to the bill, the Florida Legislature passed a bill to remove Disney's quasi-government district Reedy Creek; Florida Governor Ron DeSantis signed the bill, which took effect on June 1. On June 28, Disney's board members unanimously agreed to give Chapek a three-year contract extension. In August, Disney Streaming exceeded Netflix in total subscriptions with 221 million subscribers compared to Netflix's 220 million.

 2022 onward: Bob Iger's return 

On November 20, 2022, Iger accepted the position of Disney's CEO after Chapek was dismissed following a poor earnings performance. The board announced Iger would serve for two years with a mandate to develop a strategy for renewed growth and help identify a successor. In February 2023, Disney announced that it will be cutting $5.5B in costs, which includes eliminating 7000 jobs representing 3% of its workforce. Disney plans to reorganize into three divisions: Entertainment, ESPN, and Parks, Experiences and Products. In 2023, Disney began its "100 Years of Wonder" campaign in celebration of the centennial anniversary of the company's founding. This included a new animated centennial logo intro for the Walt Disney Pictures division, a touring exhibition, special events at the parks and a well-received commemorative commercial that aired during Super Bowl LVII.

 Company units 

The Walt Disney Company operates three primary business segments:

 Disney Entertainment oversees the company's full portfolio of entertainment media and content businesses globally, including The Walt Disney Studios,  Disney General Entertainment Content, Disney Streaming and Disney Platform Distribution. The division is led by Alan Bergman and Dana Walden.
 ESPN is responsible for the management and supervision of the company's full portfolio of sports content, products, and experiences across all of Disney's platforms worldwide, including its international sports channels. The division is led by James Pitaro.
 Disney Parks, Experiences and Products (DPEP) encompasses the company's award-winning theme parks, cruise line, resort destinations, and Adventures by Disney and National Geographic Expeditions, as well as Disney's global consumer products, games, and publishing businesses. The division is led by Josh D'Amaro.

 Leadership 

 Current 
Board of directors

 Susan Arnold (Chairman)
 Mary Barra
 Safra Catz
 Amy Chang
 Francis deSouza
 Carolyn Everson
 Michael Froman
 Bob Iger
 Maria Elena Lagomasino
 Calvin McDonald
 Mark Parker
 Derica W. Rice

Executives
 Bob Iger, Chief Executive Officer Alan Bergman, Co-Chairman, Disney Entertainment
 Jennifer Cohen, Executive Vice President, Corporate Social Responsibility
 Josh D'Amaro, Chairman, Disney Parks, Experiences and Products
 Horacio Gutierrez, Senior Executive Vice President and General Counsel
 Jolene Negre, Associate General Counsel and Secretary
 Alicia Schwarz, Senior Vice President and Chief Compliance Officer
 Christine McCarthy, Senior Executive Vice President and Chief Financial Officer
 Carlos A. Gómez, Senior Vice President and Treasurer
 Diane Jurgens, Executive Vice President, Enterprise Technology and Chief Information Officer
 Alexia S. Quadrani, Senior Vice President, Investor Relations
 Brent Woodford, Executive Vice President, Controllership, Finance and Tax
 James Pitaro, Chairman, ESPN
 Paul Richardson, Senior Executive Vice President and Chief Human Resources Officer
 David Bowdich, Senior Vice President and Chief Security Officer
 Latondra Newton, Senior Vice President, Chief Diversity Officer
 Kristina Schake, Senior Executive Vice President and Chief Communications Officer
 Dana Walden, Co-Chairman, Disney Entertainment

 Past leadership Executive chairmen Bob Iger (2020–2021)Chairmen Walt Disney (1945–1960)
 Roy O. Disney (1964–1971)
 Donn Tatum (1971–1980)
 Card Walker (1980–1983)
 Raymond Watson (1983–1984)
 Michael Eisner (1984–2004)
 George J. Mitchell (2004–2006)
 John E. Pepper Jr. (2007–2012)
 Bob Iger (2012–2021)
 Susan Arnold (2022–present)Vice chairmen Roy E. Disney (1984–2003)
 Sanford Litvack (1999–2000)Presidents Walt Disney (1923–1945)
 Roy O. Disney (1945–1968)
 Donn Tatum (1968–1971)
 Card Walker (1971–1980)
 Ron W. Miller (1980–1984)
 Frank Wells (1984–1994)
 Michael Ovitz (1995–1997)
 Michael Eisner (1997–2000)
 Bob Iger (2000–2012)Chief executive officers (CEO) Roy O. Disney (1929–1971)
 Donn Tatum (1971–1976)
 Card Walker (1976–1983)
 Ron W. Miller (1983–1984)
 Michael Eisner (1984–2005)
 Bob Iger (2005–2020; 2022–present)
 Bob Chapek (2020–2022)Chief operating officers'''
 Card Walker (1968–1976)
 Ron W. Miller (1980–1984)
 Frank Wells (1984–1994)
 Thomas O. Staggs (2015–2016)

Awards and nominations

As of 2022, the Walt Disney Company has won 135 Academy Awards, 32 of them were awarded to Walt. The company has won 16 Academy Awards for Best Animated Short Film, 16 for Best Original Song, 15 for Best Animated Feature, 11 for Best Original Score, 5 for Best Documentary Feature, 5 for Best Visual Effects, and several others as well special awards. Disney has also won 29 Golden Globe Awards, 51 British Academy of Film and Television Arts (BAFTA) awards, and 36 Grammy Awards as of 2022.

 Legacy 
The Walt Disney Company is one of the world's largest entertainment companies and is considered to be a pioneer in the animation industry, having produced 790 features, 122 of which are animated films. Many of their films are considered to be the greatest of all time, including Pinocchio, Toy Story, Bambi, Ratatouille, Snow White and the Seven Dwarfs, and Mary Poppins. Disney has also created some of the most influential and memorable fictional characters of all time, such as Mickey Mouse, Woody, Captain America (MCU), Jack Sparrow, Iron Man (MCU), and Elsa.

Disney has been recognized for revolutionizing the animation industry; according to Den of Geek, the risk of making the first animated feature Snow White and the Seven Dwarfs has "changed cinema". The company, mainly through Walt, has introduced new technologies and more-advanced techniques for animating, as well as adding personalities to characters. Some of Disney's technological innovations for animation include invention of the multiplane camera, xerography, CAPS, deep canvas, and RenderMan. Many songs from the company's films have become extremely popular, and several have peaked at number one on Billboard's Hot 100. Some songs from the Silly Symphonies series became immensely popular across the U.S.

Disney has been ranked number 53 in the 2022 Fortune 500 list of the largest United States corporations by total revenue and fourth in Fortune's 2022 "World's Most Admired Companies". According to Smithsonian Magazine, there are "few symbols of pure Americana more potent than the Disney theme parks", which are "well-established cultural icons", with the company name and Mickey Mouse being "household names". Disney is one of the biggest competitors in the theme park industry with 12 parks, all of which were the top-25 most-visited parks in 2018. Disney theme parks worldwide had over 157 million visitors, making it the most-visited theme-park company in the world, doubling the attendance number of the second-most-visited company. Of the 157 million visitors, the Magic Kingdom had 20.8 million of the guests, making it the most-visited theme park in the world. When Disney first entered the theme park industry, CNN stated: "It changed an already legendary company. And it changed the entire theme park industry." According to The Orange County Register, Walt Disney World has "changed entertainment by showing how a theme park could help make a company into a lifestyle brand".

 Criticism and controversies 

The Walt Disney Company has been criticized for making purportedly sexist and racist content in the past, putting LGBT+ elements in their films, and not having enough LGBT+ representation. There have been controversies over alleged plagiarism, poor pay and working conditions, and poor treatment of animals. Several of Disney's films have been considered to be racist; one of the company's most-controversial films Song of the South was criticized for portraying racial stereotypes. For that reason, the film was never released to home video in the U.S. or Disney+. Other characters that have been called racist are Sunflower, a black centaurette who serves a white centaurette in Fantasia; the Siamese cats in Lady and the Tramp, who are considered to be over-exaggerated as Asians, stereotypes of Native Americans in Peter Pan, and crows in Dumbo, who are depicted as African Americans who use jive talk. Their leader being named Jim Crow, which is considered to be a reference to racial segregation laws in the U.S. When watching a film on Disney+ considered to have wrongful racist stereotypes, Disney added a disclaimer before the film starts to help avoid controversies.

Disney has also been accused a number of times of plagiarizing already existing works in its films. Most notably, The Lion King has many similarities in its characters and events to an animated series called Kimba the White Lion by animator Osamu Tezuka. Atlantis: The Lost Empire also has many similarities to the anime show Nadia: The Secret of Blue Water that were considered so prevalent the latter show's creator Gainax was planning to sue Disney but was stopped by its series' network NHK. Kelly Wilson, creator of the short The Snowman (2014), filed two lawsuits, one which came after the first was rescinded, against Disney for copyright infringement in Disney's animated film Frozen. Disney later settled the lawsuit with Wilson, allowing the company to create a sequel to Frozen. Screenwriter Gary L. Goldman sued Disney over its film Zootopia, claiming he had earlier pitched an identical, same-titled story to the company. A judge dismissed the lawsuit, stating there was not enough evidence to prove any plagiarism.

Disney has been criticized for both putting LGBT+ elements into its films and for having insufficient LGBT+ representation in its media. In the live-action film Beauty and the Beast, director Bill Condon announced LeFou would be depicted as a gay character, prompting Kuwait, Malaysia, and a theater in Alabama to ban the film, and Russia to give it a stricter rating. In Russia and several Middle Eastern countries, the Pixar movie Onward was banned for having Disney's first openly lesbian character Officer Specter, while others said Disney needed more representation of LGBT+ persons in its media. Because of a scene featuring two lesbians kissing, Pixar's Lightyear was banned in 13 predominantly Muslim countries, and barely broke even at the box office. In a leaked video of a Disney meeting, participants talked about pushing LGBT+ themes in the company's media, angering some people, who say the company is "trying to sexualize children", while others applauded its actions.

Some Disney Princess films have been considered to be sexist toward women. Snow White is said to be too worried about her appearance while Cinderella is deemed to have no talents. Aurora is also said to be weak became she is always waiting to be rescued. In some of the princess films, men have more dialogue, and there are more speaking male characters than female. Disney's more-recent films are considered to be less sexist than its earlier films.

In 1990, Disney paid $95,000 to avoid legal action over 16 animal-cruelty charges for beating vultures to death, shooting at birds, and starving some birds at Discovery Island. The company took these actions because they were attacking other animals and taking their food. When Animal Kingdom first opened, there were concerns about the animals because a few of them died. Animal rights groups protested but the United States Department of Agriculture found no violations of animal-welfare regulations. Disney has been accused of having poor working conditions. A protest by 2,000 workers at Disneyland accused the company of poor pay at an average of $13 an hour, with some saying they were evicted from their homes. In 2010, at a factory in China where Disney products were being made, workers experienced working hours three times longer than those prescribed by law, and one of the workers committed suicide.

 Financial data 

 Revenues 

 Operating income 

 See also 

 Lists of films released by Disney
 List of Disney television series
 Disney University
 Disneyfication
 Buena Vista
 Mandeville-Anthony v. Walt Disney Co., a federal court case in which Mandeville claimed Disney infringed on his copyrighted ideas by creating Cars''
 List of conglomerates
 List of acquisitions by Disney

References

Notes

Citations

Works cited

Further reading

External links

 
 

 
1923 establishments in California
1940s initial public offerings
American companies established in 1923
Companies based in Burbank, California
Companies in the Dow Jones Industrial Average
Companies listed on the New York Stock Exchange
Conglomerate companies established in 1923
Conglomerate companies of the United States
Entertainment companies based in California
Entertainment companies established in 1923
Culture of Hollywood, Los Angeles
Mass media companies established in 1923
Mass media companies of the United States
Multinational companies headquartered in the United States